Harry Daniel Leinenweber (born June 3, 1937) is a senior United States district judge of the United States District Court for the Northern District of Illinois.

Education and career
Born in Joliet, Illinois, Leinenweber received a Bachelor of Arts degree from the University of Notre Dame in 1959 and a Juris Doctor from the University of Chicago Law School in 1962. He was in private practice in Joliet from 1962 to 1986. He was a city attorney of Joliet from 1963 to 1967. He was a special prosecutor in Will County, Illinois from 1968 to 1970. He was a special counsel for the Village of Bolingbrook, Illinois from 1975 to 1977. He was a special counsel for Will County Forest Preserve, Illinois in 1977. He was a Republican member of the Illinois House of Representatives from 1973 to 1983.

Federal judicial service
Leinenweber was nominated by President Ronald Reagan on November 7, 1985, to the United States District Court for the Northern District of Illinois, to a new seat created by 98 Stat. 333. He was confirmed by the United States Senate on December 16, 1985, and received his commission on December 17, 1985. He assumed senior status on June 3, 2002.

References

Sources
 

1937 births
Living people
Illinois lawyers
Judges of the United States District Court for the Northern District of Illinois
Republican Party members of the Illinois House of Representatives
People from Joliet, Illinois
United States district court judges appointed by Ronald Reagan
20th-century American judges
University of Notre Dame alumni
University of Chicago Law School alumni
20th-century American lawyers
21st-century American judges